Sandförde is a railway station in the village of Sandförde, Mecklenburg-Vorpommern, Germany. The station lies on the Angermünde–Stralsund railway and the train services are operated by Ostseeland Verkehr.

Train services
The station is served by the following service:
Regional services  Bützow - Neubrandenburg - Pasewalk - Ueckermünde Stadthafen

References
Deutsche Bahn website

Railway stations in Mecklenburg-Western Pomerania
Railway stations in Germany opened in 1892
Buildings and structures in Vorpommern-Greifswald